Scopula elwesi is a moth of the  family Geometridae. It is found in Russia.

References

Moths described in 1922
elwesi
Moths of Asia